Steffen Haas (born 18 March 1988 in Karlsruhe) is a German footballer who played as a midfielder for SpVgg Durlach-Aue.

References

External links
 
 

Living people
1988 births
Association football midfielders
German footballers
Germany youth international footballers
TSG 1899 Hoffenheim players
Kickers Offenbach players
Karlsruher SC players
SV Wehen Wiesbaden players
FC Astoria Walldorf players
2. Bundesliga players
3. Liga players
Regionalliga players
Footballers from Karlsruhe
21st-century German people